Antonio Hysén (born Glenn Anton Hysén 13 December 1990) is a Swedish footballer who plays as a defender.

Football career
He was given a trainee contract with BK Häcken from 2007 to 2009, but was hindered by injuries and instead joined Utsiktens BK in 2010 after spending the spring of 2010 at North Carolina Wesleyan College in Rocky Mount, North Carolina. In 2014, he  played with the American fourth division team Myrtle Beach FC. In 2015, he signed with Torslanda IK.

Personal life
Hysén is the son of former Swedish international Glenn Hysén, and was born in Liverpool, when his father was playing for Liverpool F.C.  Antonio Hysén came out as gay to the Swedish football magazine Offside in March 2011. The BBC called him "a global one-off".

Hysén was profiled on Swedish broadcaster TV4 on 9 March 2011, in a debate show moderated by Lennart Ekdal titled Får även bögar spela fotboll? ("Can gays play football too?").

As of 2011, he worked part-time as a construction worker.

His older brothers are football players Tobias Hysén (half-brother) and Alexander Hysén. He won the seventh season of Let's Dance, being the first openly gay person to win this competition. He is the great-grandson of Erik Hysén.

References

External links
Torslanda IK official website

1990 births
Living people
Footballers from Liverpool
Swedish footballers
Association football defenders
BK Häcken players
Gay sportsmen
Dancing with the Stars winners
21st-century LGBT people
LGBT association football players
Swedish LGBT sportspeople